Walligan is a rural locality in the Fraser Coast Region, Queensland, Australia. In the  Walligan had a population of 377 people.

Geography 
Approximately half of the land is developed freehold land and is used as acreage blocks for semi-rural residences with some agricultural use. The remainder still in government ownership, much of it being part of the Vernon Conservation Park which occupies .

History 
The Hervey Bay railway line opened in 1896 passing through Walligan where there was a railway station. Passenger services ended in 1973 but the line continue to be used for freight until the line's closure in 1993. It is now used as a mobility corridor for pedestrians, cyclists and mobility scooters.

In the  Walligan had a population of 377 people.

Road infrastructure
Maryborough-Hervey Bay Road (State Route 57) runs along most of the eastern boundary. Torbanlea-Pialba Road runs through from south-east to south-west.

References

External links 

Fraser Coast Region
Localities in Queensland